Preng railway station is a railway station located in Khlong Preng Subdistrict, Mueang Chachoengsao District, Chachoengsao Province.

References 

Railway stations in Thailand
Chachoengsao province